Xu Binshu (born July 28, 1988, in Changchun, Jilin) is a Chinese former competitive figure skater. She is the 2004 & 2006 Chinese national champion. She won the bronze medal at the 2007 Asian Winter Games.

On February 14, 2011, Xu's age became the subject of controversy. Although her International Skating Union bio lists Xu as born on July 28, 1988, a Chinese skating association website suggested she was born on July 29, 1990, but it disappeared from the website by February 15. On February 17, the ISU said there were no discrepancies in terms of the birthdates listed on Xu's passport, ISU registration forms and the Chinese Olympic Committee's website.

Programs

Competitive highlights

References

External links 

 

Living people
1988 births
Chinese female single skaters
Figure skaters from Changchun
Asian Games medalists in figure skating
Figure skaters at the 2007 Asian Winter Games
Asian Games bronze medalists for China
Medalists at the 2007 Asian Winter Games
Competitors at the 2009 Winter Universiade